Igor Andronic (born 11 March 1988 in Chișinău) is a Moldovan professional football player.

Personal life
He is the cousin of Valeriu Andronic and also of the brothers Oleg and Gheorghe Andronic, all of whom are international footballers.

Honours
Zimbru Chișinău
Moldovan Cup: 2006–07
Milsami Orhei
Moldovan Cup: 2011–12

References

External links
 
 
 
 

1988 births
Living people
Footballers from Chișinău
Moldovan footballers
Moldova international footballers
Moldovan expatriate footballers
FC Zimbru Chișinău players
FC Hoverla Uzhhorod players
FC Milsami Orhei players
FC Academia Chișinău players
Hapoel Afula F.C. players
FC Dinamo-Auto Tiraspol players
Speranța Nisporeni players
FC Ungheni players
FC Codru Lozova players
FC Victoria Bardar players
Moldovan Super Liga players
Ukrainian Premier League players
Liga Leumit players
Expatriate footballers in Ukraine
Expatriate footballers in Israel
Moldovan expatriate sportspeople in Ukraine
Moldovan expatriate sportspeople in Israel
Association football defenders